Bishop Creek is a stream in Yosemite National Park, United States. It is a tributary of the South Fork Merced River.

Bishop Creek was named for Samuel Addison Bishop of the Mariposa Battalion who settled near its banks.

See also
List of rivers of California

References

Rivers of Mariposa County, California
Rivers of Northern California